Saint-Godefroi is a township municipality in the Canadian province of Quebec, located within the Bonaventure Regional County Municipality. The township had a population of 380 in the Canada 2016 Census.

It is situated on the north shore of Chaleur Bay along Quebec Route 132. In addition to Saint-Godefroi itself, the township also includes the community of Kelly.

Demographics 

Mother tongue:
 English as first language: 6.8%
 French as first language: 87.8%
 English and French as first language: 0%
 Other as first language: 5.4%

See also
List of township municipalities in Quebec

References

Township municipalities in Quebec
Incorporated places in Gaspésie–Îles-de-la-Madeleine